Bisa Abrewa Museum is a museum with sculptural representations of wood, clay, cement, paintings and photographs in Nkontompo in the Sekondi-Takoradi Metropolis of the Western Region, Ghana. The Museum has about 2,200 artifacts of heroes of Africa struggle. Also sculptural pieces and photographs of the civil rights movement and other Black personalities in French, Portuguese and Spanish Caribbean.

The Museum is believed to be one of the world's largest private collections of artifacts, audio visual and sculptures representing the African story. It was inaugurated by the first lady of Ghana, Rebecca Akuffo Addo, government officials and traditional leaders on July 28, 2019.

History 
The Museum was curated by Kwaw Ansah, an award-winning filmmaker, founder and first CEO of TV Africa. The collections of artifacts started 40 years ago.

References 

Art museums and galleries in Ghana
Buildings and structures in Kumasi